Christine Stevens may refer to:

Chris Stevens (mathematician), American mathematician
Christine Stevens (animal welfare activist) (1918–2002), American animal welfare activist and conservationist

See also
Christine Stephens, New Zealand psychology academic